Bill Ronald (born 7 June 1949) is an Australian former fencer. He competed in three events at the 1968 Summer Olympics. Two years later he went on to compete in three events in the 1970 Commonwealth Games, winning a silver medal in the team foil.

Early life
Bill Ronald went to school at St Andrews Cathedral School, Sydney. He joined St Andrews Cathedral School in Year 3. While at the school he learnt fencing under Tex Clarke.

References

External links
 

1949 births
Living people
Australian male fencers
Olympic fencers of Australia
Fencers at the 1968 Summer Olympics
People from Katoomba, New South Wales
Commonwealth Games medallists in fencing
Commonwealth Games silver medallists for Australia
Fencers at the 1970 British Commonwealth Games
Sportsmen from New South Wales
Medallists at the 1970 British Commonwealth Games